The 2017 NRL Auckland Nines (known as the Downer NRL Auckland Nines due to sponsorship) was the fourth NRL Auckland Nines competition. It was held on 4–5 February 2017 at Eden Park in Auckland, New Zealand. Just like previous tournaments, it was contested by all sixteen National Rugby League teams. The draw for the competition was announced by the NRL on 17 November 2016. The same pool names were used as in the 2015 and 2016 tournaments. The pool names were: Hunua, Waiheke, Rangitoto and Piha. The event included two international women's teams, the Kiwi Ferns and the Jillaroos, who competed in a three-game series won by the Jillaroos for the first time, with a 3-0 clean sweep. The tournament was again sponsored by Downer Group. The Sydney Roosters won the tournament by defeating the Penrith Panthers 10-8 in the final.

Tournament Games

Hunua pool

Rangitoto pool

Waiheke pool

Piha pool

Finals

Quarterfinals

Semi-finals

Final

Ferns v Jillaroos

Team of the tournament
Connor Watson was named the player of the tournament. The team of the tournament was;

References

NRL Auckland Nines
Auckland Nines